Miss India Worldwide 1996 was the sixth edition of the international female pageant. The final was held in New York City, New York, United States. The total number of contestants is not known. Sandhya Chib  of India was crowned as the winner at the end of the event.

Results

Special awards

Delegates
 – Rishma Malik
 – Sharon Chandni
 – Sandhya Chib
 – Krijay Govender
 – Pooja Kumar

Crossovers
Contestants who previously competed or will compete at other beauty pageants:
Miss Universe
1996: :  Sandhya Chib (Semi-finalists)

External links
http://www.worldwidepageants.com/

References

1996 beauty pageants